Marie-Alise Recasner (born May 25, 1962, Hollywood, California) is an American soap opera actress, best known as Alice Jackson on Santa Barbara from 1986 to 1987. She also had a recurring role as Millie on the sitcom A Different World. She portrayed the second Ellen Burgess on Port Charles from 1998 to 1999 and played Lynne Burke on Days of Our Lives from 1994 to 1998. She appeared on the sitcom Benson in 1986 as LaToya season 7 episode 12 "Summer of Discontent" playing the part of Benson's nephew's girlfriend.

External links
 

Living people
1962 births
American television actresses
African-American actresses
American soap opera actresses
Actresses from Hollywood, Los Angeles
21st-century African-American people
21st-century African-American women
20th-century African-American people
20th-century African-American women